Mae Ai may refer to:
 Mae Ai District
 Mae Ai Subdistrict
 Mae Ai Municipality